See also:
1950s in comics,
other events of the 1960s,
1970s in comics and the
list of years in comics

Events and publications

1960

July 
 House of Mystery #100, edited by Jack Schiff. (DC Comics)

1961

Amazing Adventures #1 - Marvel Comics
Fantastic Four #1 - Marvel Comics

1962

Amazing Fantasy #15 renamed from Amazing Adult Fantasy - Marvel Comics (last issue)
First appearance of Spider-Man
Incredible Hulk #1 - Marvel Comics
Strange Tales Annual #1 - Marvel Comics

1963

The Amazing Spider-Man #1 - Marvel Comics
Avengers #1 - Marvel Comics
Fantastic Four Annual #1 - Marvel Comics
Sgt. Fury and his Howling Commandos #1 - Marvel Comics
Uncanny X-Men #1 -[Marvel Comics

1964

The Amazing Spider-Man Annual #1 - Marvel Comics
Daredevil #1 - Marvel Comics
Marine War Heroes #1-18 - Charlton
Marines Attack #1-9 - Charlton
Marvel Tales Annual #1 - Marvel Comics

1965

Journey into Mystery Annual #1 - Marvel Comics
Marvel Collector's Item Classics #1 - Marvel Comics
Sgt. Fury and his Howling Commandos Annual #1 - Marvel Comics

1966

 Sally the Witch, by Mitsuteru Yokoyama, is first serialized on Ribon.

March 
Tales to Astonish #77: "Bruce Banner is the Hulk," drawn by John Romita (Marvel Comics)
 Black Fury, with issue #57 (March /April  cover-date), canceled by Charlton.

April 
 April 28: Tarzan artist Jesse Marsh passes away at age 58.

May 
Daredevil #16 (Marvel Comics): "Enter Spider-Man," drawn by John Romita
 Ghostly Tales #1 (Charlton)

June 
 First appearance of Poison Ivy in Batman #181 (DC Comics).

July 
Marvel Tales #3 renamed from Marvel Tales Annual (Marvel Comics)

August 
The Amazing Spider-Man #39 (Marvel Comics): "How Green Was My Goblin"

September 
The Amazing Spider-Man #40 (Marvel Comics): "Spidey Saves The Day"
Thor Annual #2 renamed from Journey into Mystery Annual  (Marvel Comics)
 With issue #110, DC Comics suspends publication of Mystery in Space (1951 series); the title is temporarily revived in 1980.

November 
 The Flash #165: Barry Allen marries Iris West (DC Comics).

1967

January 
Batgirl debuts in Detective Comics #359. The issue was titled "The Million Dollar Debut of Batgirl" and was written by Gardner Fox and illustrated by Carmine Infantino (DC Comics)

December 
 Mac Raboy dies at age 53.

1968

 Zap Comix #1 self-published; begins the underground comix movement

1969

 The Golden Age character Phantom Stranger makes his first Silver Age appearance in Showcase #80.

July 
 Long-time DC Comics logo designer and letterer Ira Schnapp dies at age 76.

September 
 Classics Illustrated cartoonist Alex Blum dies at age 80.

 
1960s decade overviews